Charles, Count de Lambert (30 December 1865, in Funchal – 26 February 1944, in Saint-Sylvain-d'Anjou) was an early European aviator.

In 1904 Count Lambert built an experimental hydrofoil boat which was first tested in May 1904 on the River Seine near Paris. It had twin hulls and was powered by a 14HP De Dion-Bouton motor. Even with this modest power it was able to rise up on the hydrofoils until the hull just skimmed the water with only the propeller below the surface reaching a speed of 20 mph.

De Lambert was the first person in France to be taught to fly by Wilbur Wright. The first lesson took place at Le Mans on 28 October 1908, and by August 1909 he owned 2 Wright biplanes. On 18 October 1909 de Lambert "left the Juvisy Aerodrome at 4:36 o'clock in a Wright machine, flew across Paris to the Eiffel Tower, circled it, and returned to his starting point, arriving safely at 5:25." De Lambert claimed that he flew 300 feet above the 1,000 foot Eiffel Tower, which was nearly equal to Orville Wright's height record set in Berlin.

Lambert, along with Hubert Latham and Louis Blériot, was one of the three main contenders for the £1,000 prize offered by the Daily Mail for a successful crossing of the English Channel in an aeroplane, although he was not motivated by the monetary value.  He took his pair of Wright ''Flyers (Nos. 2 and 18) and set up camp at Wissant to practice and wait for good weather. Latham made the first real attempt, but foundered and landed on the water, and Lambert damaged his 'Flyers' while practising. The prize was won by Louis Blériot on 25 July 1909.

Personal life
Count de Lambert was married first to Louise with whom he had a daughter, Jane de Lambert. After they divorced Louise married the Marquis de Ivanrey, Ricardo Soriano (Ricardo Soriano von Hermansdorff Sholtz) and then the aviation engineer Léon Lemartin who raised Jane as his own daughter. After Louise's death in December 1907 and his own death in an air-crash in 1911, Jane de Lambert was eventually parented by Lemartin's second wife Madeline and her second husband, his brother Albert Lemartin.

Count de Lambert's second wife was Cordelia de Lambert.

References and notes

External links

Website on the life of Count de Lambert (Wayback Machine)

1865 births
People from Funchal
1944 deaths
French aviators